Gustavus Handcock (13 August 1693 – 4 September 1751) was an Irish politician.

He was the son of Stephen Handcock, fourth son of William Handcock. Handcock entered the Irish House of Commons in 1723, holding his seat for Athlone until 1727. He represented the constituency again from 1732 until his death in 1751.

In July 1725, he married Elizabeth Temple, daughter of Robert Temple. Their only child Robert sat also in the Parliament of Ireland.

References

1693 births
1751 deaths
Irish MPs 1715–1727
Irish MPs 1727–1760
Members of the Parliament of Ireland (pre-1801) for Athlone